Sergey Alexandrovich Maslov (born 21 March 1975) is a former Russian professional association football player.

Club career
He made his professional debut in the Soviet Second League B in 1991 for FC Mashuk Pyatigorsk. He played 2 games in the UEFA Intertoto Cup 1999 for FC Rostselmash Rostov-on-Don.

He scored eight goals in one game in a 1999 Russian Second Division match for FC Rostselmash-d Rostov-on-Don against FC Iriston Vladikavkaz in a 9–2 victory. That was a record for most goals in one game in Russian professional football he shared with Andrey Tikhonov and Gennady Korkin until Igor Kiselyov scored ten goals in 2001.

References

1975 births
People from Kurganinsky District
Living people
Soviet footballers
Russian footballers
Association football forwards
Russian Premier League players
FC Dynamo Stavropol players
FC Rostov players
FC Sodovik Sterlitamak players
Russian expatriate footballers
Expatriate footballers in Azerbaijan
FC Mashuk-KMV Pyatigorsk players
Sportspeople from Krasnodar Krai